Electric Lady Sessions is a live in-studio album by American rock band LCD Soundsystem. It was released on February 8, 2019, through DFA and Columbia Records. It was recorded over a three-day span at Electric Lady Studios in Manhattan, New York, during their American Dream Tour. The session featured a twelve-song setlist that included covers of songs by Heaven 17, Chic, and the Human League.

Promotion and release
Prior to any announcement of the album's release, the band had a Spotify Singles release on September 12, 2018, featuring live performances of their American Dream song "Tonite", their This Is Happening song "Home", and a cover of Chic's 1978 song "I Want Your Love", which had been in the band's live setlist rotation during their tour. Following the release, band member Al Doyle revealed on Twitter that the band performed a session at Electric Lady Studios and that there would be more music from the session, including covers, released in the future. On November 2, the band released a cover of Heaven 17's 1981 song "(We Don't Need This) Fascist Groove Thang" along with a confirmation that they would be releasing a live album, titled Electric Lady Sessions, at some point in the future. The band revealed the album's details and made it available for pre-order on January 11, 2019.

Electric Lady Sessions was released on February 8, 2019, through DFA Records and Columbia Records. It was made available on digital platforms and on vinyl. The vinyl release features two 180-gram 12-inch vinyl records housed in a gatefold package.

Track listing

Personnel
Personnel adapted from Tidal and album liner notes.

LCD Soundsystem
James Murphy – lead vocals , backing vocals , piano , bells , cowbell , timpani , guitar , synthesizer
Pat Mahoney – drums , backing vocals 
Al Doyle – backing vocals , lead vocals , guitar , percussion, synthesizers , electric piano
Nancy Whang – backing vocals , lead vocals , piano , synthesizer 
Rayna Russom – backing vocals , lead vocals , synthesizers , percussion
Tyler Pope – bass guitars , bass synthesizers 
Matt Thornley – synthesizers , guitars , glockenspiel , cowbell , bells , MPC
Korey Richey – tambourine , drums , piano , synthesizers , glockenspiel , backing vocals 

Technical personnel
James Murphy – production, recording, mixing
Beatriz Artola – recording
Korey Richey – recording, photography
Gosha Usov – recording assistance
Bob Weston – mastering

Charts

Release history

References

2019 live albums
LCD Soundsystem albums
Columbia Records albums
DFA Records albums
Albums recorded at Electric Lady Studios